Tiquadra nivosa is a moth of the family Tineidae. It was described by Cajetan Felder, Rudolf Felder and Alois Friedrich Rogenhofer in 1875. It is known from Brazil.

Hostplants
Its larvae was found in rotten stems of papaya (Carica papaya L.).

References

Hapsiferinae
Moths described in 1875
Moths of South America